Johannes Korndörfer (born in 1980) is a German music theorist, church  musician and composer.

Life 
Korndörfer attended the Komponistenklasse Dresden, a school for young composers, studying with Silke Fraikin from 1991 to 1998. He then studied composition, music theory and piano at the Musikhochschule für Dresden, and further studied musicology there, graduating in 2006. Among his teachers were Jörg Herchet for composition, Clemens Kühn and John Leigh for music history, and Christine Haupt for piano. From 2006, Korndörfer has taught music theory, at the Hochschule für Musik Carl Maria von Weber Dresden and its associated , at the TU Dresden from 2010, and from 2011 at the Berlin University of the Arts. In 2009 he published a book about the composer Bernd Alois Zimmermann. He was a developer of the multimedia program to train hearing, by the Dresden Zentrum für Musiktheorie (Centre for music theory).

Korndörfer became instructor of the Komponistenklasse in 1998. He was also appointed organist of the Schifferkirche  in Dresden- in 1999. Together with Matthias Herbig, he founded a choir and the ensemble Maria am Wasser.

His orchestral composition Horch! was premiered in 2004 by the Sinfonietta Dresden, conducted by Milko Kersten.

Awards 
The Komponistenklasse was awarded the 2015 Initiativpreis für Kunst und Kultur of Saxony, for its engagement for the early training in music creation.

Publications 
Monographs
 Johannes Korndörfer: Zimmermanns Intercomunicazione: Regel und Freiheit beim Komponieren (in German) .

Articles

References

External links 
 
 Zimmermanns Intercomunicazione exlibris.ch
 "Das Wohlpräparierte Klavier" – Neues Album für die Jugend (in German) schumann-portal.de 2020
 Pressestimmen (in German) Komponistenklasse

German classical organists
German music theorists
Living people
1980 births